Labola Sankrala is a village in the Tiéfora Department of Comoé Province in south-western Burkina Faso. The village has a population of 825.

References

Populated places in the Cascades Region
Comoé Province